Al-Hait Football Club  is a Saudi Arabian football team in Al Hait City playing at the Saudi Fourth Division.

References

External links
 Al Hait Club at Kooora.com

Hait
Football clubs in Al Hait
1977 establishments in Saudi Arabia
Association football clubs established in 1977